Francis Johnson (June 19, 1776 – May 16, 1842) was a U.S. Representative from Kentucky.

Born in Caroline County, Virginia, Johnson pursued preparatory studies.
He studied law.
He was admitted to the bar and practiced. He owned slaves.
He moved to Woodford County, Kentucky, in 1796 and to Bowling Green in 1807.
He served as member of the State house of representatives in 1812, 1813, and 1815.

Johnson was elected as a Democratic-Republican to the Sixteenth Congress to fill the vacancy caused by the death of David Walker and reelected to the Seventeenth Congress.

Johnson was elected as an Adams-Clay Republican to the Eighteenth Congress and as an Adams candidate to the Nineteenth Congress and served from November 13, 1820, to March 3, 1827.
He served as chairman of the Committee on the Post Office and Post Roads (Seventeenth and Eighteenth Congresses).
He moved to Louisville, Kentucky, in 1829 and resumed the practice of law.
He served as Commonwealth attorney for the fifth district.
He was an unsuccessful Republican candidate for Governor.
He died in Louisville, Kentucky, May 16, 1842.
He was interred in the old family burial ground, later a municipal playground.

References

1776 births
1842 deaths
People from Caroline County, Virginia
Democratic-Republican Party members of the United States House of Representatives from Kentucky
National Republican Party members of the United States House of Representatives from Kentucky
Members of the Kentucky House of Representatives
American slave owners
People from Woodford County, Kentucky
Politicians from Bowling Green, Kentucky
Politicians from Louisville, Kentucky